Robert Lynch may refer to:

 Robert Nugent Lynch (born 1941), Bishop of St. Petersburg, Florida
 Robert Clyde Lynch (1880–1931), physician
 Bobby Lynch (1881–1959), baseball player and Wisconsin State Assemblyman
 Bob Lynch (musician) (1935–1982), Irish folk musician and former member of The Dubliners
 Bob Lynch (footballer) (born 1944), Australian rules footballer
 Robert Lynch (Auckland cricketer) (born 1982), New Zealand cricketer
 Robert Lynch (Wellington cricketer) (1856–1938), New Zealand cricketer
 Rob Lynch (born 1986), English singer-songwriter and teacher